Iași, Romania, is claimed to have been built on seven hills. Many other cities of the world have similar traditions, Rome and Constantinople, for instance, were said to have been built on seven hills.

The hills
Each hill is populated with monuments, religious buildings, or parks:

 Cetățuia hill: Cetățuia Monastery (1668), Hlincea Monastery (1587), Frumoasa Monastery (1733);
 Galata hill: Galata Monastery (1582), Nicolina balneotherapy and well-being Centre;
 Copou hill: Podgoria Copou Monastery (1638), Iași Botanical Garden, Copou Park, Exhibition Park, and many monumental buildings;
 Breazu hill;
 Șorogari hill;
 Bucium hill: Bucium Monastery (1853), Bârnova Monastery (1628);
 Repedea hill: the Repedea Hill Fossil Site.

Gallery

See also 
 List of cities claimed to be built on seven hills
 Seven hills

References

External links
 Seven hills of Iaşi 

Tourist attractions in Iași
Geography of Iași County